Gooroolba is a rural locality in the North Burnett Region, Queensland, Australia.

Geography

History
The town's name is an abbreviation of the parish name of Gooroolballin, in turn named after the "Gooroolballan" sheep station. Gooroolballan station was established by at least 1857.

The extension of the Degilbo to Wetheron in 1906 brought the railway to Gooroolba. A tender was let for construction of a state school in the town in 1910.

Gooroolba Post Office opened by June 1910 (a receiving office had been open from 1907) and closed in 1973.

Gooroolba State School opened on 18 April 1911. It closed in 1964.

Mingo Crossing Provisional School opened circa July 1913 and was renamed Fleetwood Provisional School later that year. Allawah Provisional School opened on 7 July 1913. The two schools operated as half-time schools, sharing a single teacher between them.  Fleetwood Provisional School closed circa 1915 with Allawah Provisional School becoming a full-time school until it closed in 1917.

In 1917, a cyclone caused significant damage to the town, destroying the public hall and partially wrecking the hotel and two private stores.

The Gooroolba War Memorial is located near the railway crossing. Originally erected to commemorate those who served in World War I, the names of those who served in World War II were added later.

References

Further reading

External links

Wide Bay–Burnett
North Burnett Region
Localities in Queensland